is a Japanese football player.

Club statistics
Updated to 23 February 2016.

References

External links

1988 births
Living people
Kyoto Sangyo University alumni
Association football people from Shiga Prefecture
Japanese footballers
J2 League players
J3 League players
Japan Football League players
Kataller Toyama players
Zweigen Kanazawa players
Association football defenders